Annamma Betta is a Christian  pilgrim centre in the city of Bengaluru (Bangalore), Karnataka, and is situated in the Uttarahalli and Arehalli hill ranges. This hillock is also referred to as Hanumagiri Betta or Annamma Betta or Yesu Betta or even Shilube Betta. Days are these where the trees are uprooted and the lush greenery is blackened, and same is the fate of small hillocks in and around Bengaluru.

The legend of Annamma dates back to Tipu Sultan's era. Uttarahalli then a Christian pocket was lying by the side of Tipu's cavalry path. During that period according the legend the lonely girl Annamma had fallen prey to the Mysuru soldiers and in the bid of escape she fell down from the hill. Repenting on this the soldiers have buried Annamma and erected a cross on the grave. Thus Annamma became the village deity and people from all walks started adoring her. Till today the hill is popularly called as Annamma Betta (betta = hill) and one can see a huge steel cross on the tip of the hill erected by Rev.Fr. Briand.

During Lent the Christians follow the Way of the Cross. The pictures showing Jesus accepting the death sentence and carrying the cross to the Mount Calvary or Golgotha is being recited along the 14 stations is called the 'Way of the Cross'. Every Friday evenings during Lent the Churches witness this performance of the Cross procession. The same Way of the Cross if performed in the hillock Annamma Betta.

Annamma Betta is the seat of the Stations of the Cross for two centuries. The day that is the fifth Sunday (this year it is on 21 March 2021) of the Lent the surface of the mountain will be filled with the devotees climbing the mountain surface.

At the foot of the hill is the legendary Annamma's cemetery and there is also a Catholic Church and an adoration chapel. Carrying his own cross, mourning at 14 different stations gives a bare witness to a man scaling his life overcoming all the hurdles. Thus the Way of the Cross at the Annamma betta unveils the different faces of devotion.

References

Further reading

 Talwadi, Dr. BS. Kannada Chraistara Habba mattu Jatregalu (Bengaluru: Karnataka Chraista Janapada Kendra, 1996, pp.100-101)
 Lingaiha, D. Bengaluru Darshana (Bengaluru: Udayabhanu Kannada Sangha, vol.II - Jathregalu)
 Ramesh, Dr. SC Ramesh. Karnatakada Janapada Acharanegalu (Hampi: Kannada University,2010)
 Talwadi, Dr. BS. Chraista Kannada Janapada (Bengaluru: Annapoorna Prakashana)

References

Further reading
 Talwadi, Dr. BS. Kannada Chraistara Habba mattu Jatregalu (Bengaluru: Karnataka Chraista Janapada Kendra, 1996, pp.100-101)
 Lingaiah, D. Bengaluru Darshana (Bengaluru: Udayabhanu Kannada Sangha, vol.II - Jathregalu)
 Ramesh, Dr. SC Ramesh. Karnatakada Janapada Acharanegalu (Hampi: Kannada University, 2010)
 Talwadi, Dr. BS. Chraista Kannada Janapada (Bengaluru: Annapoorna Prakashana)
 Nandagaon, FM. Shilubeyatreya Vishishta Jaatre (Prajavani: Saapthahika Puravani, 03 Mar 2003)
 Shilube Bettadalondu Sambhramada Jaatre (Prajavani: Saapthahika Puravani, 04 Apr 2006)
 Talwadi, BS. Annammana Bettada Jaatre (Vijayakarnataka, 16 Apr 2006)
 Marie Joseph, C. Bhanuvara Annamma Bettada Jaatre (Prajavani: Metro,27 Mar 2009)

Religious buildings and structures in Bangalore